James Francis McGovern also known as Francis James McGovern (September 13, 1893 – April 8, 1976) was an American college football and basketball player and coach. He served as the head football coach at West Chester University of Pennsylvania from 1924 to 1928. McGovern also served as the head football coach at Kutztown University of Pennsylvania from 1935 to 1943.

McGovern died on April 8, 1976, in Gulf Breeze, Florida.

References

External links
 Kutztown Hall of Fame profile
 

1893 births
1976 deaths
Muhlenberg Mules football players
Kutztown Golden Bears football coaches
Kutztown Golden Bears men's basketball coaches
West Chester Golden Rams football coaches
West Chester Golden Rams men's basketball coaches
Sportspeople from Elmira, New York